Stephan Janse van Rensburg (born ) is a South African rugby union player who last played for  in the Currie Cup and the Rugby Challenge. His regular position is centre.

References

South African rugby union players
Living people
1994 births
Rugby union players from Bloemfontein
Rugby union centres
Free State Cheetahs players